The 2008 IIHF World Championship Division II  was an international Ice hockey tournament run by the International Ice Hockey Federation.  The tournament was contested from April 7–13, 2008. Participants in this tournament were separated into two separate tournament groups. The Group A tournament was contested in Miercurea Ciuc, Romania. Group B's games were played in Newcastle, Australia.

Groupings

Group A 
Group A was contested in  Miercurea Ciuc:

Group B
Group B was contested in  Newcastle:

Group A Tournament

Fixtures 
All times local.

Standings

Group B Tournament

Fixtures 
All times local.

Standings

External links
Group A at the IIHF
Group B at the IIHF

IIHF World Championship Division II
3
2008
2008